Joseph Edwardus Jessop was a sailor from the United States, who represented his country in the Snowbird in Los Angeles, United States During race four and five.

Sources
 

1898 births
1996 deaths
American male sailors (sport)
Sailors at the 1932 Summer Olympics – Snowbird
Olympic sailors of the United States